Charles Victor (10 February 1896 – 23 December 1965) was a British actor who appeared in many film and television roles  between 1931 and 1965. He was born Charles Victor Harvey.

Born in Southport, Lancashire, England, Victor was a fourth-generation English music hall entertainer. He left school when he was 15 to team with his father in a song-and-dance act for five years. After leaving that act, he briefly worked with his brother in an automobile agency before going into English musical comedy. In 1929, he joined the Birmingham Repertory Theatre, which was headed by Barry Jackson, and stayed with it for 10 years.

Victor appeared in just over 100 films between 1938 and 1966. The size and importance of his roles varied greatly. For example, in 1957 he played the lead role, with top billing, in the comedy There's Always a Thursday, whilst in the same year he had a bit part in the biopic After the Ball.

Late in life, Victor toured internationally in the role of Alfred Doolittle in My Fair Lady, performing the role on The Ed Sullivan Show on 19 March 1961 during a tribute to Alan Jay Lerner and Frederick Loewe.

Selected filmography

 Return of the Frog (1938) as Customer in Night Club (uncredited)
 Hell's Cargo (1939) as Mr. Martin
 Where's That Fire? (1939) as Garage Owner (uncredited)
 Laugh It Off (1940) as Colonel
 Contraband (1940) as Hendrick
 Dr. O'Dowd (1940) as Dooley
 Old Mother Riley in Society (1940) as Sir John Morgan
 You Will Remember (1941) as Pat Barrett
 Major Barbara (1941) as Bilton
 Old Mother Riley in Business (1941)
 East of Piccadilly (1941) as Editor
 This England (1941)
 Atlantic Ferry (1941) as Tim Grogan
 He Found a Star (1941) as Ben Marsh
 49th Parallel (1941) as Andreas
 Ships with Wings (1941) as MacDermott
 Rush Hour (1941, Short) as Bus Inspector (uncredited)
 The Missing Million (1942) as Nobby Knowles
 Breach of Promise (1942) as Sir William
 The Next of Kin (1942) as Joe, Irish seaman
 The Foreman Went to France (1942) as Aircraft Spotter on Works Roof
 They Flew Alone (1942) as Postmaster
 Let the People Sing (1942) as Bit Role (uncredited)
 Lady from Lisbon (1942) as Porter
 Seven Days' Leave (1942) as Mr. Charles Victor
 Those Kids from Town (1942) as Vicar
 The Peterville Diamond (1943) as Dan
 Squadron Leader X (1943) as Marks
 The Silver Fleet (1943) as Bastiaan Peters
 When We Are Married (1943) as Mr. Northrup
 The Bells Go Down (1943) as Bill, Dunkirk Survivor (uncredited)
 Undercover (1943) as Sergeant
 The Saint Meets the Tiger (1943) as Bittle
 Rhythm Serenade (1943) as Mr. Martin
 Escape to Danger (1943) as Petty Officer Flanagan
 My Learned Friend (1943) as 'Safety' Wilson
 They Met in the Dark (1943) as Pub Owner
 San Demetrio London (1943) as Deckhand
 It Happened One Sunday (1944) as Frisco Kid
 The Man from Morocco (1945) as Bourdille
 I Live in Grosvenor Square (1945) as Taxi Driver
 The Way to the Stars (1945) as Corporal Fitter
 The Rake's Progress (1945) as Old Sweat
 Caesar and Cleopatra (1945) as 1st. Porter
 Gaiety George (1946) as Danny Collier
 This Man Is Mine (1946) as Hijacker
 The Magic Bow (1946) as Peasant Driver
 While the Sun Shines (1947) as Tube Train Conductor
 Woman to Woman (1947) as Stage Manager
 Meet Me at Dawn (1947) as 1st Client
 Temptation Harbour (1947) as Gowshall
 Green Fingers (1947) as Joe Mansel
 While I Live (1947) as Sgt. Pearne
 The Calendar (1948) as John Dory
 Broken Journey (1948) as Harry Gunn
 Vote for Huggett (1949) as Mr. Hall
 Fools Rush In (1949) as Mr. Atkins
 Landfall (1949) as Mona's Father
 The Cure for Love (1949) as Henry Lancaster
 Waterfront (1950) as Bill
 The Woman in Question (1950) as Albert Pollard
 The Fighting Pimpernel (1950) as Colonel Winterbotham
 The Galloping Major (1951) as Sam Fisher
 Calling Bulldog Drummond (1951) as Insp. McIver
 The Magic Box (1951) as Industry Man
 Encore (1951) as Mr. Bateman (segment "The Ant and the Grasshopper")
 The Frightened Man (1952) as Rosselli
 Something Money Can't Buy (1952) as Borough Treasurer
 The Ringer (1952) as Inspector Wembury
 Made in Heaven (1952) as Aubrey Topham
 Appointment in London (1952) as Dobbie
 Those People Next Door (1953) as Joe Higgins
 Street Corner (1953) as Muller
 Murder Without Tears (1953)
 The Saint's Return (1953) as Chief Insp. Claud Teal
 Meet Mr. Lucifer (1953) as Mr. Elder
 The Girl on the Pier (1953) as Inspector Chubb
 The Love Lottery (1954) as Jennings
 Fast and Loose (1954) as Lumper
 The Rainbow Jacket (1954) as Voss
 The Embezzler (1954) as Henry Paulson
 For Better, for Worse (1954) as Fred
 Police Dog (1955) as Sergeant
 Value for Money (1955) as Lumm
 An Alligator Named Daisy (1955) as Police Sergeant (uncredited)
 Dial 999 (1955) as Tom Smithers
 Now and Forever (1956) as Farmer Gilbert
 Charley Moon (1956) as Miller Moon
 The Extra Day (1956) as Bert
 Eyewitness (1956) as Police Desk Sergeant
 Home and Away (1956) as Ted Groves
 Tiger in the Smoke (1956) as Will
 There's Always a Thursday (1957) as George Potter
 The Prince and the Showgirl (1957) as Theatre Manager
 After the Ball (1957) as Stagehand
 Band of Angels (1957) as Officer (uncredited)
 Passion Holiday (1963) (uncredited)
 Made in Paris (1966) as Livingston (uncredited)

References

External links

English male film actors
English male television actors
1896 births
1965 deaths
People from Southport
Male actors from Lancashire
20th-century British male actors
20th-century English male actors